Bielawy may refer to:

Bielawy, Gmina Nakło nad Notecią in Kuyavian-Pomeranian Voivodeship (north-central Poland)
Bielawy, Gmina Szubin in Kuyavian-Pomeranian Voivodeship (north-central Poland)
Bielawy, Wąbrzeźno County in Kuyavian-Pomeranian Voivodeship (north-central Poland)
Bielawy, Gmina Barcin in Kuyavian-Pomeranian Voivodeship (north-central Poland)
Bielawy, Gmina Janowiec Wielkopolski in Kuyavian-Pomeranian Voivodeship (north-central Poland)
Bielawy, Włocławek County in Kuyavian-Pomeranian Voivodeship (north-central Poland)
Bielawy, Kutno County in Łódź Voivodeship (central Poland)
Bielawy, Łęczyca County in Łódź Voivodeship (central Poland)
Bielawy, Łowicz County in Łódź Voivodeship (central Poland)
Bielawy, Wieruszów County in Łódź Voivodeship (central Poland)
Bielawy, Ciechanów County in Masovian Voivodeship (east-central Poland)
Bielawy, Gostynin County in Masovian Voivodeship (east-central Poland)
Bielawy, Mława County in Masovian Voivodeship (east-central Poland)
Bielawy, Gniezno County in Greater Poland Voivodeship (west-central Poland)
Bielawy, Grodzisk Wielkopolski County in Greater Poland Voivodeship (west-central Poland)
Bielawy, Kalisz County in Greater Poland Voivodeship (west-central Poland)
Bielawy, Konin County in Greater Poland Voivodeship (west-central Poland)
Bielawy, Kościan County in Greater Poland Voivodeship (west-central Poland)
Bielawy, Leszno County in Greater Poland Voivodeship (west-central Poland)
Bielawy, Pleszew County in Greater Poland Voivodeship (west-central Poland)
Bielawy, Rawicz County in Greater Poland Voivodeship (west-central Poland)
Bielawy, Gmina Słupca in Greater Poland Voivodeship (west-central Poland)
Bielawy, Gmina Strzałkowo in Greater Poland Voivodeship (west-central Poland)
Bielawy, Lubusz Voivodeship (west Poland)
Bielawy, Bytów County in Pomeranian Voivodeship (north Poland)
Bielawy, Chojnice County in Pomeranian Voivodeship (north Poland)
Bielawy, Kartuzy County in Pomeranian Voivodeship (north Poland)
Bielawy, Warmian-Masurian Voivodeship (north Poland)